Vancouver Sleep Clinic (VSC) is an Australian band led by singer, songwriter, and record producer Tim Bettinson.

Career
Tim Bettinson, a past student of Citipointe Christian College, was a finalist in triple j's Unearthed High competition in 2013. Vancouver Sleep Clinic released its debut EP, Collapse, in late 2013.

Bettinson has collaborated with a wide range of artists, including American DJ Seven Lions, Chinese American musician Zhu, Madeon, Raury, Wafia, and Gnash. He worked with Grammy Award-winning Al Shux on Vancouver Sleep Clinic's debut album, titled Revival, released on April 7, 2017.

The band released an EP called Therapy Phase 01 in March 2018, followed in June by Therapy Phase 02. In 2019, the second studio album Onwards to Zion was released.

Touring and appearances 
The band has toured extensively since 2013. It did a European tour in August 2014, when Bettinson was aged 18.

It toured again for the debut album Revival (2017) as the headline act, covering the UK, France, Germany, Belgium, Netherlands, Switzerland, Canada, USA, New Zealand, and Australia.

Prior to these headline tours, Vancouver Sleep Clinic supported Daughter, London Grammar, Angus and Julia Stone, and The Naked and Famous on their respective Australian and New Zealand tours (2015 and 2016), as well as London Grammar on their 2014 US and Canadian tour, and Daughter on their 2016 US and Canadian tour. In 2018, VSC toured the Therapy (2017) EPs when supporting Angus & Julia Stone on their European tour as well as playing their own headline shows. This was followed by a A/NZ tour and then a debut Asian tour.

Discography

Studio albums
 Revival (2017)
 Onwards to Zion (2019)
 Fallen Paradise (2022)

EPs
 Winter (2014)
 Therapy Phase 01 (2018)
 Therapy Phase 02 (2018)
 From a Distant Dream... (2021)

Singles
 "Vapour" (2013)
 "Collapse" (2013)
 "Hold on We're Going Home"  (2014) 
 "Flaws" (2014)
 "Lung" (2016)
 "Killing Me to Love You" (2016)
 "Someone to Stay" (2017)
 "Unworthy" (2017)
 "Closure" (2018) 
 "Ayahuasca" (2018)
 "Vixen" (2018) 
 "In the End" (2018)
 "Silver Lining" (2018)
 "Don't Matter to Me"  (2018) 
 "Mercy" (2018)
 "Bad Dream" (2019)
 "Summer '09" (2019)
 "Fever" (2019)
 "Middle Of Nowhere" (2020)
 "The Wire" (2021)
 "Love You Like I Do" (2022)
 "The Flow" (2022)
 "Blood Money" (2022)

Guest appearances
 "Superfly" (2014) (with Raury)
 "Modern Conversation" (2015) 
 "Only Way Out" (2015) 
 "Fading Through" (2015) (with Wafia)
 "Stargazing" (2017) (with Gnash)
"Change Your Mind" (2018) (with Said The Sky)
"Moon" (2020) (with OTR)
"Call On Me" (2022) (with Seven Lions)

Videos

Film, TV, and other platforms

References

Living people
Ambient musicians
Australian pop musicians
Musicians from Brisbane
1996 births